David Kibet (born November 24, 1963, in Burnt Forest) is a former Kenyan middle distance runner who won a bronze medal at the African Championships 1990 over 1500 m. Kibet finished tenth in the 1992 Summer Olympics final and seventh in the 1991 World Championships. His greatest achievement was the victory in the Oslo Dream Mile 1992 where he defeated the world champion Noureddine Morceli. In 1992 he also set a temporary Kenyan record in 1500 m at 3:32.13 minutes.

External links

1963 births
Living people
Kenyan male middle-distance runners
Athletes (track and field) at the 1992 Summer Olympics
Olympic athletes of Kenya